Omar Jasika (born 18 May 1997) is an Australian tennis player. He is the 2014 US Open boys' singles champion defeating Quentin Halys in the final. Jasika along with Naoki Nakagawa also won the 2014 US Open boys' doubles title after defeating Rafael Matos and João Menezes in the final. In winning both, Jasika became the first player in 28 years to win both the boys’ singles and doubles events at the US Open.

Jasika has a career-high singles ranking of World No. 223 achieved on 30 January 2023 and a career-high doubles ranking of World No. 220 achieved on 23 May 2016.

Personal life
Jasika was born in Melbourne, Australia. He is of Bosnian descent. His parents, Admir and Bina, emigrated from Bosnia and Herzegovina to Australia during the Bosnian War before Omar was born. He is the eldest child in his family and his brother, Amor, is also an aspiring professional tennis player. Jasika began playing tennis at the age of six. He attended South Oakleigh College throughout his schooling years.

Professional tour

2014: Tour Debut

After his success at the US Open, Jasika made his ATP World Tour debut in September, after he was given a wild card into the Malaysian Open. He drew Rajeev Ram in round one, and won the first set, and was within 2 points of the match in the second, before losing in three sets. In October, Jasika made his first final at the Australia F7 in Cairns.

2015
Jasika commenced 2015 at the Onkaparina Challenger where he drew No.1 seed and world No.80 Blaž Rola. He lost in three sets.
Jasika competed in the qualifying for the Australian Open, when he won two rounds, but lost in the final round to Marius Copil. In February, he played in the Australia Futures 1 tournament, where he lost in the final to Brydan Klein. In March, Jasika headed to China where he made the final round of qualifying in both Guangzhou and Shenzhen Challengers before heading to Guadeloupe where he qualified for and made the quarter final of the Guadeloupe Challenger. In May, Jasika won his first ITF title in Changwon. In July, Jasika won his second ITF title in Kelowna, dropping just one set along the way.

2016
Jasika made his grand slam debut at the 2016 Australian Open after being awarded a wild card. He won his first round match, beating Illya Marchenko in 4 sets; he subsequently lost to former finalist Jo-Wilfried Tsonga in the following round in straight sets. Jasika spent the remainder of the year predominantly on the Futures circuit across North America and Europe, making numerous quarter and semi finals, but no finals. 
In December, Jasika won the Australian Open wildcard play-off, earning him direct entry into the 2017 Australian Open. Jasika ended the year with a ranking of 367.

2017: First Challenger title
Jasika commenced the year with a wildcard into the Happy Valley Challenger where he reached his first ATP Challenger Tour final. At the 2017 Australian Open, Jasika lost in round 1 to David Ferrer. In February, Jasika won his first Challenger title in Burnie. In March, Jasika returned to the ITF circuit in Australia, reaching the semi final of the F2 in Canberra. In July, Jasika travelled to North America and competed on the Challenger Circuit, winning just one match. In September, Jasika reached the quarter final of Shanghai Challenger and in October, the quarter final of the Canberra Challenger. Jasika ended 2017 with a ranking of 276 .

2018
Jasika commenced the season by reaching the quarter final of the Playford Challenger before losing in round 1 2018 Australian Open – Men's singles qualifying. He was suspended from professional tennis by ASADA for two years after having tested positive for cocaine in December 2017. Jasika was eligible to play again in March 2020.

From 2020: Return from suspension
Jasika returned from suspension at the ITF tournament held in Geelong, Australia in March 2020, losing in the first round of qualifying. His career was then stalled by the Covid-19 pandemic. He played his next professional match in February 2022 at the ITF tournament in Canberra, where he reached the quarter-final. In March 2022, in his fourth tournament back, Jasika won the ITF tournament in Bendigo. Following this, he won an ITF tournament in Chiang Rai, Thailand, in April 2021. Overall, he has won five ITF tournaments since his return.

At the 2023 Australian Open, Jasika lost in the first qualification round to Denis Kudla.

ATP Challenger and ITF Futures/World Tennis Tour finals

Singles: 14 (8–6)

Doubles: 3 (1–2)

Junior career

ITF Junior finals (4)

Singles: 4 (2 titles, 2 runners-up)

Junior Grand Slam finals

Singles: 1 (1 title)

Doubles: 1 (1 title)

Performance timelines

Singles

Doubles

References

External links
 
 
 

1997 births
Living people
Australian male tennis players
US Open (tennis) junior champions
Australian people of Bosnia and Herzegovina descent
Tennis players from Melbourne
Doping cases in tennis
Grand Slam (tennis) champions in boys' singles
Grand Slam (tennis) champions in boys' doubles
Sportsmen from Victoria (Australia)